Émile Adolphe Eugène Champion (August 7, 1879 in Laval, Mayenne – 1921) was a French track and field athlete, born in Paris, who competed in the early 20th century. He was a long-distance runner but specialized in the marathon and won a silver medal in Athletics at the 1900 Summer Olympics in Paris.

References

External links 
 

1879 births
1921 deaths
Olympic athletes of France
Athletes (track and field) at the 1900 Summer Olympics
French male long-distance runners
French male marathon runners
Olympic silver medalists for France
Athletes from Paris
Medalists at the 1900 Summer Olympics
Olympic silver medalists in athletics (track and field)
19th-century French people
20th-century French people
Date of death missing
People from Laval, Mayenne
Sportspeople from Mayenne
Place of death missing